Órgiva is a Spanish town municipality in comarca of Alpujarra Granadina (which is located within the larger Alpujarras region) in the province of Granada, Andalusia. It has a population of around 6,000 and lies in the Alpujarra valley between the Sierra de Lújar and Sierra Nevada.

Overview
In recent years it has become a popular tourist destination for those visiting the Alpujarras, and the town is often described as "the gateway" to this area. Bus services connect Órgiva to the coast and Málaga, to Lanjarón and the provincial capital Granada, and to the villages of the Alpujarras. A large market is held on Thursdays.  The town is host to a newly opened municipal swimming pool and football pitch. There are three well known alternative communities in the area, the most famous being Beneficio.

Gallery

References

External links 

 Órgiva official website
 Older Órgiva official website
 Oldest Órgiva official website
Visit Alpujarras: your holiday quide, travel information and rural accommodation - Órgiva
Órgiva, Las Alpujarras info
The Puentes Language School
The Dragon Festival, Orgiva
Con jamón – living in Orgiva
GranadaSpain page on Orgiva

Municipalities in the Province of Granada